Bolgatanga Senior High School (also known as Big BOSS) is a public co-educational Senior High School located in Winkongo, a town about 8km south of Bolgatanga, the Upper East regional capital. in actual fact, the school is within the Talensi-Nabdam District. 

Motto: To the Glory of God and the Honour of Ghana.

History 
The school was established in 1970, precisely on the 15 October, 1970 with 75 students in Zuarungu on the same campus presently occupied by Zuarungu Senior High School, with Mr. Bayala C.J. Yibrul as its first Headmaster.  The number of staff then was eleven in total: three professional teachers and eight supporting staff.

Vision 
The vision of the school is to nurture and develop a reputable world class second cycle institution capable of churning out self-motivated and self-disciplined students imbibed with excellent leadership skills to compete in the globalised world.

Mission 
The mission of Bolgatanga Senior High School is to striving to achieve excellence through the harnessing of available human, financial and material resources to provide optimised opportunities for its students,

unearthing their potentials through self-awareness and self-realisation.

Programmes offered 
Bolgatanga Senior High School offers five major academic programmes, namely: 

 Business 
 General Arts
 Home Economics
 Science
 Visual Arts

Achievements 
Records show that students from Bolgatanga Senior High School perform well in WASSCE examinations and national sports competitions. The school also won the 2016/17 National Health Insurance Scheme Quiz competition.

2016: National Health Insurance Quiz Champions.

2015 and 2016: National Science and Maths Quiz – 1/8 stage

Sports Champions since 2013-2017 at Zonals and Super Zonals levels

2011 to 2017: Second best performing school in WASSCE to Notre Dame Senior High School

2014 and 2016: Best Choral Music and Drama champion

Information 

 School type: Public Senior High School
 Established: 1970
 School district: Talensi-Nabdam District
 Headmaster: Afelibiek Ababu
 Category: A
 Gender: Coeducational  (Mixed)
 Accommodation status: Day and Boarding

Headmasters 
List of pass Headmasters of Bolgatanga Senior High School:
 Bayala C. J. Yibrul
 Mr. Quansah
 E. K. Daraan
 Didacus A Afegra
 Ababu Afelibig
Michael Yeinime Moni$on

Discipline 

The school was forced to temporally closed down following student riots over the death of their colleague student. A committee was set up to investigate the matter.

References 

High schools in Ghana
Educational institutions established in 1970
1970 establishments in Ghana
Upper East Region